Andrea Caracciolo (born 18 September 1981) is an Italian football director and former player, currently chairman of Lumezzane.

A striker, Caracciolo was also a full Italy international, having made two senior appearances between 2004 and 2006.

Biography 
Born in Milan to a Southern family and raised in Cesano Boscone, Caracciolo has a diploma in electrical engineering.

Caracciolo's family practiced football: his father, originally from Reggio Calabria, was a midfielder in various Lombard teams; his brother Vincenzo played in Varese, whereas his uncle Fortunato was awarded as the best player in an edition of the Viareggio Tournament.

He is nicknamed Airone (Italian for "heron") for his characteristic way of cheering.

He is married to Gloriana Falletta and has two twin children, Beatrice and Riccardo, born on 5 October 2011.

Club career

Early years 
Caracciolo first football appearances were for Sancolombano of Italian Serie D (amateur league); later playing for Como and Pro Vercelli, both in professional leagues, before being signed by Brescia in June 2001, in co-ownership deal for lire 470 million (€242,735).

Brescia 
Caracciolo made his Serie A debut on 6 January 2002, against Bologna. In June 2002, Brescia bought him outright.

During the 2002–03 Serie A season he played for Perugia, before returning to Brescia, scoring 12 goals at the end of the 2003–04 season.

Palermo 
After the relegation of Brescia, he was signed by Palermo on 1 July 2005, for €9 million., with €3 million being converted to the signing of Davide Possanzini. He soon became Luca Toni's replacement, who left for Fiorentina. In the 2005–06 season, Caracciolo played 35 games, scoring 9 goals. In the next season, Caracciolo has limited chance since the arrival of Amauri and David Di Michele. He scored only 5 goals in 27 matches, and made 17 starts.

Sampdoria 
In June 2007 was sold to Sampdoria in a co-ownership bid, for €4.25 million. as their centre forward Emiliano Bonazzoli is recovering from injury, Francesco Flachi, Fabio Bazzani and Fabio Quagliarella all left the club. That month also saw Caracciolo replaced Quagliarella, Quagliarella replaced Vincenzo Iaquinta and Fabrizio Miccoli replaced Caracciolo. Moreover, Sampdoria and Palermo formed numbers of swap deal in 2006 summer transfer windows, made there was a net debt of about €2.2 million from Palermo to Sampdoria on 30 June 2007 (without counting Caracciolo; or exactly €3.5 million ca in July 2006);, made the signing of Caracciolo again involved little cash.

He faced competition from Claudio Bellucci, Antonio Cassano and fit again Bonazzoli, which he made only 6 starts.

Return to Brescia 
On 31 January 2008 Caracciolo agreed to return to Brescia in a permanent transfer, for €7.05 million, with Sampdoria received half of the transfer fee (€3.55 million) Yet, instead of receiving cash, Sampdoria signed Morris Donati and Mattia Mustacchio in co-ownership deal for €300,000 and €700,000 respectively and rested of the credit was used for signing Marius Stankevičius (€3M) in early July.

Genoa & Novara 
In 2011–12 Serie A, Caracciolo had half his rights bought by Genoa C.F.C. for €1.5 million in another co-ownership deal, which the club was searching for a reliable centre forward for years; Genoa also failed to sign Antonio Floro Flores early in June and sell Sergio Floccari after the expire of loan. Caracciolo also re-joined former Como owner Enrico Preziosi, who signed former players of Genoa or Como in recent seasons, likes Abdoulay Konko (January 2011), Cesare Bovo (2011). However Caracciolo failed to meet the demand of the management team.

Novara 
In January 2012 Genoa signed Italian internationals Alberto Gilardino and Rodrigo Palacio was recovered. It made Caracciolo no room in starting eleven. Caracciolo was loaned to Serie A struggler Novara (18th at that time), replacing the left of Riccardo Meggiorini. He scored his first goal on 12 February, marking the winner in a 1–0 shock exploit at Stadio San Siro against Inter.

In June 2012, Genoa sold back the 50% registration rights back to Brescia for €200,000.

Second return to Brescia 
Caracciolo became a member of Brescia in 2012–13 Serie B. On 22 November 2014, he scored a hat-trick of penalties in a 3–3 home draw against Carpi, match valid for 15th week of 2014–15 Serie B.

Later years 
On 2018, after his contract with Brescia ended, he signed for Serie C club FeralpiSalò.

On 28 July 2020 he signed a 2-year contract with Lumezzane.

International career
Caracciolo played for the Italy U-21 team, with whom he won a European U-21 Championship in 2004. He also earned a call-up to the 2002 squad.

Under manager Marcello Lippi, Caracciolo made his senior international debut for the Italian national team in a friendly match against Finland on 17 November 2004, held in Messina, coming on as a second-half substitute for Luca Toni; Italy won the match 1–0.

On 16 August 2006 he was recalled to the Azzurri squad by new coach Roberto Donadoni for a friendly game against Croatia held in Livorno, replacing Cristiano Lucarelli in the 65th minute of the 2–0 defeat.

Post-playing career
On 12 April 2022, during a press conference, Lumezzane confirmed Caracciolo's retirement from active football in order to accept an offer as the club's new director of football with immediate effect. On 6 July 2022, following the club's promotion to Serie D, the board of directors of Lumezzane appointed Caracciolo as the club's new chairman.

Career statistics

Club

International

References

External links
Caracciolo's profile from Sampdoria official website 
FIGC profile 
AIC profile 

1981 births
Living people
Footballers from Milan
Italian footballers
Italy international footballers
A.C. Perugia Calcio players
Brescia Calcio players
Palermo F.C. players
F.C. Pro Vercelli 1892 players
U.C. Sampdoria players
Genoa C.F.C. players
Novara F.C. players
FeralpiSalò players
F.C. Lumezzane V.G.Z. A.S.D. players
Association football forwards
Italy under-21 international footballers
Italy youth international footballers
Serie A players
Serie B players
Serie C players